Bruce Ford may refer to:
 Bruce Ford (rower) (born 1954), Canadian men's quadruple sculls rower in the 1984 Olympics
 Bruce Ford (tenor) (born 1956), American operatic tenor